was a town located in Mashita District, Gifu Prefecture, Japan. It had an area of 247.50 km².

On March 1, 2004, the former town of Gero absorbed the towns of Hagiwara, Kanayama and Osaka, and the village of Maze (all from Mashita District) to create the city of Gero. Following this merger, Osaka became a district within the city of Gero.

Geography
Osaka located in the south-eastern region of Hida Province in a mountainous area at the base of Mount Ontake. Due to the steep slopes of Mount Ontake, the town resides at the bottom of a ravine formed by Hida River, Osaka River and their tributaries.

97% of the land is made up of forests, which contains a number of Tenpō-growth, such as the Hinoki cypress. More than 60% of these are nationally protected.

There are also many waterfalls, including Neo Waterfall. As a result, Osaka became known as the town with the most waterfalls within Japan.

The vicinity around Mount Ontake is designated as Mount Ontake Prefectural Nature Park.

Mountains: Mount Ontake
Rivers: Hida River, Osaka River

Former neighboring municipalities
Mashita District: Hagiwara, Gero
Ōno District: Kuguno, Asahi
Kiso District, Nagano Prefecture: Kaida, Mitake, Ōtaki

History
March 7, 1875: Eleven villages merged becoming the village of Osaka, Chikuma Prefecture
August 21, 1876: With the ablation of Chikuma prefecture, the three districts (Ōno, Yoshiki, and Mashita) became part of Gifu Prefecture
July 1, 1889: Creation of the village of Osaka within Mashita District
March 2, 1898: Becomes the town of Osaka
March 1, 2004: The former town of Gero absorbed the towns of Hagiwara, Kanayama and Osaka, and the village of Maze (all from Mashita District) to create the city of Gero.

Sister cities

Domestic
Hōdatsushimizu, Ishikawa Prefecture

International
  Salesópolis (Brazil)

Sightseeing

Tourist spots
 Mount Ontake
 Neo Waterfall
 Galaxy Spa Ski Resort
 Hida Osaka cycling road
 Dandate Ravine
 Osaka Museum

Onsen
Nigorigo Onsen
Yuya Onsen
Shitajima Onsen

Transportation

Train lines
JR Central
Takayama Main Line: Hida-Osaka Station

References

External links
 Gero official website 

Dissolved municipalities of Gifu Prefecture